María Victoria Eugenia Guadalupe Martínez del Río Moreno-Ruffo (born May 31, 1962) is a Mexican actress notable for her roles in telenovelas.

Biography

1980s 
Ruffo began her acting career in 1980, starring in supporting roles in telenovela Conflictos de un Médico under the direction of Ernesto Alonso and continued her career acting in Al Rojo vivo.

In 1983, Valentín Pimsteín gave her the opportunity to star as the protagonist of La fiera as Natalia Ramirez along with Guillermo Capetillo.

In 1985, she starred in Carlos Téllez's telenovela Juana Iris, alongside Valentín Trujillo and her sister, Gabriela Ruffo.

In 1987, she worked in Ernesto Alonso's telenovela Victoria.

In 1989, Valentín Pimstein offered her the main role in telenovela Simplemente María.

1990s 
In 1993, she was the protagonist of "Capricho", a telenovela by Carlos Sotomayor as Cristina Aranda.

In 1995, she was the protagonist of Pobre Niña Rica, a telenovela by Enrique Segoviano as Consuelo Villagrán.

In 1998, she starred in telenovela Vivo por Elena as Elena Carvajal.

2000s 
In 2000, she starred in Salvador Mejía's Abrazame muy fuerte alongside Aracely Arámbula.

2005 marked her comeback in the critically acclaimed telenovela La madrastra, which she starred in with César Évora.

After La madrastra, she performed duties as the First Lady of Pachuca, with her husband acting as mayor, while continuing to star in the telenovelas.

In 2007, Victoria starred in the Telemundo production Victoria alongside Arturo Peniche and Mauricio Ochmann.

In 2008, she played a leading role in Carlos Moreno's En nombre del amor together with Leticia Calderón, Allisson Lozz and Altaír Jarabo. She played Macarena sister to Leticia Calderón's character, Carlota.

2010s 
In 2010, she was named one of Latin America's 50 Most Beautiful People.

In mid-2010, she was confirmed to lead in Salvador Mejía Alejandre's telenovela Triunfo del amor, where she played "Victoria", starring alongside Maite Perroni, William Levy, and Diego Oliveira.

After Triunfo del amor, Ruffo focused on her family and doing theater plays—specifically Dulce Pajaro de Juventud. She also went to support the senatorial campaign of her husband Omar, who eventually won a seat in the senate.

In 2012, José Alberto Castro confirmed Ruffo to star in telenovela Corona de lágrimas, alongside José María Torre, Mané de la Parra, Alejandro Nones, and Adriana Louvier—she won the 31st TVyNovelas Awards for Best Lead Actress due to her performance in the latter.

In 2014, she played a leading role in telenovela La malquerida, alongside Ariadne Díaz, Christian Meier, África Zavala, and Arturo Peniche.

In 2016, Salvador Mejia called Ruffo to lead the cast of telenovela Las Amazonas.

In 2019, she was the protagonist of Cita a Ciegas, a comic telenovela where Ruffo made the crossover to the comedy genre. Her role as Maura was well received and was the first telenovela where she did not cry.

Personal life 
Ruffo is the sister of actress and radio host Gabriela Ruffo and producer Marcela Ruffo. She and Eugenio Derbez have one son José Eduardo Derbez (born 1992). On March 9, 2001, she married Mexican politician Omar Fayad, who is the Governor of Hidalgo.

On August 11, 2004, she gave birth to her twins, daughter Victoria and son Anuar.

Television roles

Awards and nominations

TVyNovelas Awards

Premios Bravo

Premios People en Español

References

External links 
Official website
Telemundo website
 

1962 births
Living people
Mexican telenovela actresses
Mexican television actresses
Mexican film actresses
Mexican voice actresses
Actresses from Mexico City
20th-century Mexican actresses
21st-century Mexican actresses
Mexican people of Italian descent
People from Mexico City